IC 4997 is  a planetary nebula located in the constellation of Sagitta. It was discovered in 1896 by Edward Charles Pickering and Williamina Fleming in 1896, and independently by Gustav Gruss in 1896. This nebula is about 14,000 light-years from Earth. It looks like an ordinary star in smaller telescopes, and only detailed study of its spectrum reveals its nebular characteristics.

Physical characteristics 

IC 4997 is very young and very dense with a very high nebular temperature of around 20,000 K, which is twice those measured in most nebulae. The mean expansion velocity of the nebula seems to be slow at 20 km/s at the outer layer, while it also reaches a maximum expansion velocity of 60 km/s relative to its central star. Its central star has a magnitude of around 14m and a temperature of around 47,000--59 000 K.

The most characteristic feature of IC 4997 is its variability. In the 1960s, there was a sudden change in its spectrum. 
Variability could be related to the nebula expansion or an episodic smoothly changing stellar wind.

See also
 List of planetary nebulae
 List of largest nebulae
 Lists of nebulae

References 

Planetary nebulae
Sagittarius (constellation)